Joannes van Doetecum the Elder (1530 – 1605) was a Dutch engraver-cartographer known for his etched works after genre scenes by Pieter Bruegel the Elder and maps of various cities in the Netherlands.

He was born in Deventer and moved to Haarlem in 1578. He was the father of Johannes II, Peter and Baptista, and was the brother of Lucas van Doetecum, with whom he collaborated on many print series.

Works

References 

1530 births
1605 deaths
People from Deventer
16th-century engravers